Dioscorea stipulosa is a type of climbing tuberous geophyte of the family Dioscoreaceae. It is endemic to the Eastern Cape province of South Africa.

References

stipulosa